Suryodaya Municipality is a municipality located in Province No. 1 of Nepal in Ilam district. Suryodaya is the Nepali translation for “Sunrise".

It was formed by merging three village development committees i.e. Phikal Bazar, Panchakanya and Kanyam in May 2014 and Pashupatinagar, Shree Antu, Samalbung, Gorkhe, Laxmipur (except ward number 5) and ward 8 and 9 of Jogmai in February 2017. It is the largest municipality in the district of Ilam in terms of area.

It covers the central part of the district of Ilam bordering Darjeeling in the east in east, Ilam municipality in the West, Rong Rural Municipality in the South, Mai Municipality in the South-West and Maijogmai rural municipality in the North. It offers three major transit points to India namely Pashupatinagar, Chhabisay and Manebhanjyang including other minor points like Okayti Godamdhura.

Population 
The 2011 population was 56,691.

Suryodaya Municipality hosts many tourist attractions like Shree Antu, Kanyam tea garden and Pashupatinagar.

Localities 

 Gairigaun

Geography 
Latitude: 26°53'27"N

Longitude: 88°3'54"E

Climate: sub-tropical and sub-humid

Topography: Terrain

Elevation: 1,565 m (5,135 ft)

Area: 225.52 km2

Population: 58114

Population Density: 251/km^2

References 

Populated places in Ilam District
Municipalities in Koshi Province
Nepal municipalities established in 2014
Municipalities in Ilam District